Ian Jeffrey Walton (born 17 April 1958) is an English former professional footballer who played as a midfielder.

References

1958 births
Living people
People from Goole
English footballers
Association football midfielders
Grimsby Town F.C. players
Scunthorpe United F.C. players
Goole Town F.C. players
English Football League players